Desmond J. Bryant (born December 15, 1985) is a former American football defensive tackle. He played college football at Harvard and was signed by the Oakland Raiders as an undrafted free agent in 2009.

Early life and college career
Bryant was born in Shorewood, Illinois to Alton and Lillian Bryant. He graduated from East Bladen High School at Elizabethtown, North Carolina in 2004. In his senior season, Bryant helped his high school football team to a 13-1 record. That was his only year playing high school football in North Carolina. His high school number is retired at East Bladen. Bryant played football and basketball for three years while attending high school in Middletown, Delaware and played for the East Bladen basketball team for two seasons. With a weighted 4.2 grade point average and 1230 SAT score, Bryant chose Harvard despite offers by Duke, Florida A&M, and Towson University. As Ivy League schools do not offer athletic or academic scholarships, Bryant received a financial aid scholarship. Harvard coach Tim Murphy thought that Bryant could be a four-year starter and potentially a professional player and compared Bryant to a Southeastern Conference player. At Harvard, Bryant majored in psychology and played 32 games in four seasons. In his senior season, Bryant was named second-team All-Ivy League after leading Harvard with eight quarterback hurries and 4.5 tackles leading to losses.

Reflecting on his college years, Bryant told the Los Angeles Times: "The Ivy League's not really my type of environment. I had some really good teammates and friends, but outside of the football world I didn't interact much with the other kids."

Professional career

Oakland Raiders
Bryant is the 29th Harvard Crimson football player to play in the NFL. In April 2009, Bryant signed a free agent contract with the Oakland Raiders. Bryant played all 16 games of his rookie season and had 24 solo and 8 assisted tackles. The next season, Bryant made 2.5 sacks.

Cleveland Browns
Bryant signed with the Cleveland Browns on March 12, 2013 as an unrestricted free agent for a five-year $34 million contract, with $15 million guaranteed.

Bryant started 12 games with the Browns in 2013, recording 31 tackles and 3.5 sacks. On December 4, 2013, Bryant was placed on the reserve/non-football illness list, ending his season, after Bryant had issues with an irregular heartbeat.

Bryant returned to play in the 2014 season, playing in seven of the first nine games of the season. On November 6, 2014, Bryant sacked quarterback Andy Dalton twice en route to a 24-3 victory for the Browns over their division rival Cincinnati Bengals.

During the 2016 offseason, Bryant was ruled out for the season due to tearing a pectoral muscle while weightlifting.

On August 22, 2017, Bryant was released by the Browns.

Personal life
In June 2010, Bryant was one of five men arrested for an attack in a parking lot. Bryant was arrested on a misdemeanor criminal mischief charge for allegedly showing up drunk and shirtless at a Florida family's home on February 24, 2013. His mug shot showing him intoxicated with his eyes half closed and tongue sticking out went viral.

References

External links

 Cleveland Browns bio
 Oakland Raiders bio

1985 births
Living people
African-American players of American football
American football defensive tackles
American football defensive ends
Harvard Crimson football players
Oakland Raiders players
Cleveland Browns players
People from Elizabethtown, North Carolina
People from Middletown, Delaware
People from Shorewood, Illinois
Players of American football from Delaware
Players of American football from Illinois
Players of American football from North Carolina
Sportspeople from the Chicago metropolitan area
Sportspeople from the Delaware Valley
21st-century African-American sportspeople
20th-century African-American people
Ed Block Courage Award recipients